Homoeolabus analis, known generally as the leaf-rolling weevil or oak leaf rolling weevil, is a species of leaf-rolling weevil in the family of beetles known as Attelabidae. It is found in North America. It is often preyed upon by the obligate egg predator and nest thief Thief Weevil.

References

Further reading

External links

 

Attelabidae
Articles created by Qbugbot
Beetles described in 1794